Tom Woods is an American politician who has served as the Oklahoma Senate member from the 4th district since November 16, 2022.

Career
Prior to running for office, Woods was a farmer and business owner. He ran a dairy farm, feed store, and trucking company.

Oklahoma Senate
Woods ran for the open seat in Oklahoma's 4th Senate district in 2022. During the primary campaign, Woods questioned if candidate Hoguen Apperson was fit for office after revealing Apperson had sought treatment for depression. Woods discussion of Apperson's mental health while campaigning was criticized by Oklahoma Representative Josh West. He advanced to a runoff primary with rancher Keith Barenberg, whom he defeated in the August election. He was sworn into office on November 16, 2022.

References

21st-century American politicians
Living people
Republican Party Oklahoma state senators
Year of birth missing (living people)